Xenoturbella japonica is a marine benthic worm-like species that belongs to the genus Xenoturbella. It has been discovered in western Pacific Ocean by a group of Japanese scientists from the University of Tsukuba. The species was described in 2017 in a study published in the journal BMC Evolutionary Biology, and amended in 2018.

Xenotrubella japonica is known for lacking respiratory, circulatory and an excretory system.

Description 
The etymology of the species name corresponds to the locality where the specimens were sampled.

The body wall displays ring and side furrows. The mouth is orientated ventrally, just anterior to the ring furrow. The live specimen exhibits a conspicuous ventral epidermal glandular network. Tissues contain exogenous DNA corresponding to bivalve mollusks, the vesicomyid Acila castrensis and Nucula nucleus.

Phylogeny 
Comparison of mitochondrial DNA and protein sequences showed that the species Xenoturbella japonica is the sister group to X. bocki and X. hollandorum into a clade of 'shallow-water' taxa.

References

External links

Animals described in 2018
Xenacoelomorpha